Unique Torralba Salonga, known mononymously as Unique or stylized as UNIQUE, (born April 26, 2000) is a Filipino singer-songwriter and musician. He began his career as a vocalist and original frontman of IV of Spades and later pursued a solo career.

Career

Band frontman

2014–2018: IV of Spades

In June 2014, Allan Silonga decided to form a band for his son Blaster, who would become the band's lead guitarist. The Silongas were able to recruit drummer Badjao de Castro and bassist Zild Benitez, who are the sons of Allan's friends. Unique Salonga, who was already writing his own music, was later recruited to become the band's lead singer.

IV of Spades signed to a record label and released their first single "Ilaw sa Daan" under Warner Music Philippines.

The group's second single, "Hey Barbara" was released on July 9, 2017, and followed up by their third single "Where Have You Been My Disco?", released on December 9, 2017, via YouTube.

In 2018, the band released their fourth single called "Mundo". It became the group's highest viewed single on YouTube. The band's videos have over 100 million views on YouTube.

IV of Spades won the New Artist of the Year and the MYX Bandarito Performance of the Year and Nominated as Group of the Year at the annual Myx Music Awards. The band also won the Dreams Come True with Air Asia, the airline's search for the most promising acts in the region. The band performed with David Foster as part of their prize. They also won the Favorite New Group award at the 30th annual Awit Awards.

On May 4, 2018, Unique Salonga left IV of Spades in order to pursue a solo career.

Solo career

2018–present
In 2018, Salonga released his debut single, Midnight Sky, under the label of O/C Records of VIVA. In the same year, Salonga released his debut album, Grandma, and his first solo concert was held on September 29, 2018.

He released his second album, PANGALAN: in 2020.

Discography

Albums

Singles
as Solo Artist

with IV of Spades

Accolades

References

External links
 

Filipino rock musicians
21st-century Filipino male singers
Filipino songwriters
Living people
ABS-CBN personalities
Viva Artists Agency
Viva Records (Philippines) artists
2000 births
Singers from Manila